The 2019–2021 ICC World Test Championship was the inaugural edition of the ICC World Test Championship of Test cricket. It started on 1 August 2019 with the first Test of the 2019 Ashes series, and finished with the Final at the Rose Bowl, Southampton in June 2021.

It came nearly a decade after the International Cricket Council (ICC) first approved the idea for a World Test Championship in 2010, and following two cancelled attempts to hold the inaugural competition in 2013 and 2017.

It featured nine of the twelve Test playing nations, each of whom was scheduled to play a Test series against six of the other eight teams. Each series consisted of between two and five matches, so although all teams were to play six series (three at home and three away), they were not scheduled to play the same number of Tests. Each team were able to score a maximum of 120 points from each series and the two teams with the most points at the end of the league stage would contest the final. In the case of a draw or a tie in the final, the two teams playing the final would be declared joint champions. However, the COVID-19 pandemic impacted on the Championship, with several rounds of matches being postponed or cancelled. In November 2020, the ICC announced that the finalists would be decided by percentage of points earned.

Some of the Test series in this Championship were part of a longer ongoing series, such as the 2019 Ashes series. Also, some of these nine teams would play additional Test matches during this period which were not part of this Championship, as part of the ICC Future Tours Programme for 2018–23, mainly to give games to the three Test playing sides not taking part in this competition. On 29 July 2019, the ICC officially launched the World Test Championship.

On 2 February 2021, due to the COVID-19 pandemic, Australia postponed their away series against South Africa, resulting in a guaranteed berth in the final for New Zealand. On 6 March 2021, India also confirmed their berth for the final, after beating England by 3–1 in a home Test series. The final saw New Zealand win by eight wickets, securing their second global cricket title after their 2000 ICC KnockOut Trophy win.

Format 
The tournament was played over two years. Each team were scheduled to play six other opponents, three at home and three away. Each series consisted of between two and five Test matches. Therefore, all participants did not play the same number of Tests, but played the same number of series. At the end of the league stage the top two teams played in the final. Each match is scheduled for a duration of five days.

Point scoring
The ICC decided that the same number of points would be available from each series, regardless of series length, so that countries that played fewer Tests were not disadvantaged. It also decided that points would not be awarded for series results, but for match results only. These would be split equally between all the matches in the series, regardless of whether or not a match was a dead rubber, so that every match counted. In a five-match series, therefore, 20% of the points would be available each match, while in a two-match series, 50% of the points would be available each match.

Therefore, depending on whether the series is 2, 3, 4 or 5 matches long, the number of points awarded for a single match win would be a half, a third, a quarter, or a fifth of the maximum possible from the series. The ICC also decided that a tie should be worth half of a win and that a draw should be worth a third of a win. This all meant that after each match, a side could be awarded a half, a third, a quarter, a fifth, a sixth, an eighth, a ninth, a tenth, a twelfth or a fifteenth of the total points available from the series, depending on the result and how many matches the series happened to consist of. Ultimately, this meant a figure for the total points available from the series needs to be picked very carefully, as not many numbers give all integers when split into all these different fractions (360 does). Being a highly composite number, when 120 was split into all these fractions, an integer was obtained in all cases except one – the points awarded for a draw in a 3-match series should be 13 (a third of a third of 120), but the  had been dropped.

Each series would therefore carry a maximum of 120 points with points distributed as follows:

A team that was behind the required over rate at the end of a match would have two competition points deducted for each over it was behind. In January 2020, South Africa became the first team to be docked World Test Championship points, after a slow over-rate in the fourth Test against England.

Participants 
The nine full members of the ICC who participated were:

 
 
 
 
 
 
 
 
 

Since each team played only six of the eight possible opponents, the ICC announced that India and Pakistan would not play against each other in the first and second editions of the tournament.

The three full members of the ICC who did not participate:

 
 
 

These were the three lowest ranked full members of the ICC. They had been included in the ICC Future Tours Programme; they played a number of Test matches during this period against Championship participants and each other but these did not have bearing on the Championship.

Schedule 
The schedule for the World Test Championship was announced by the ICC on 20 June 2018, as part of the 2018–2023 Future Tours Programme.

Rather than being a full round-robin tournament in which everyone played everyone else equally, each team played only six of the other eight.

Therefore, the total number of matches played by each team (home and away) in this tournament, and the two countries that each side did not face in this tournament, were as follows. (Note: This was not the total Test matches played by each team during this period, as some countries did play further matches during this period which were not part of this Championship, as part of the ICC Future Tours Programme for 2018–23. Some of these may be against the opponents they did not play in this Championship.)

All the series were mutually agreed between the two nations involved; this had led to allegations that the schedule has been agreed based on what would provide the biggest television audiences, and therefore television receipts, rather than selecting an even spread of teams.

Since each team played a different set of opponents, they can be considered as having an easier or harder schedules.

COVID-19 pandemic

The COVID-19 pandemic impacted on international cricket fixtures, including matches in the Championship. In March 2020, the second Test match between Pakistan and Bangladesh was postponed due to the pandemic. Later the same month, the two-match series between Sri Lanka and England was also postponed. The following month saw Australia's tour to Bangladesh and the West Indies tour to England being postponed. In June 2020, the two-match series between Bangladesh and New Zealand and the three-match series between Sri Lanka and Bangladesh were both postponed. South Africa's tour of the West Indies was postponed, after the fixtures clashed with the West Indies rescheduled tour to England.

On 29 July 2020, the ICC confirmed that their attention had moved to the fixtures in the World Test Championship, with their priority on rescheduling the six Test series that had been postponed. The ICC ultimately accepted several series would not take place as part of the Championship and changed the points system to account for the variation in the number of series played per team.

Prize money
The International Cricket Council declared a total prize money pool of US$3.8 million for the tournament. The prize money was allocated according to the performance of the team as follows:

The winning team also got the ICC Test Championship Mace, previously presented to the top team in ICC Men's Test Team Rankings at the April cutoff-date of a year between 2003 and 2019.

League table 

 
  Teams qualified for final
 The top two teams advanced to the final. 
 Teams were ranked by PCT. If two teams were tied on PCT, then they were ranked by Runs Per Wicket Ratio. If teams were still tied, ranking was determined by matches won in series between the teams, finally by ranking in the Men's Test Team Rankings as at 30 April 2021.
 Under the original rules, teams were ranked first by points. If two teams were tied on points, the team that won more series was ranked higher. If teams were still equal, the runs per wicket ratio was used. This ranking system was amended in November 2020 due to the COVID-19 pandemic causing some series to be cancelled, meaning not all teams would compete for the same number of points.

League stage

2019

The Ashes (England v Australia)

Sri Lanka v New Zealand

West Indies v India

2019–20

Freedom Trophy (India v South Africa)

India v Bangladesh

Australia v Pakistan

Pakistan v Sri Lanka

Trans-Tasman Trophy (Australia v New Zealand)

Basil D'Oliveira Trophy (South Africa v England)

Pakistan v Bangladesh 

The second match was postponed due to the COVID-19 pandemic. Due to a busy schedule, the match would be postponed until the 2021–22 season and outside the Championship season.

New Zealand v India

2020

Bangladesh v Australia 

This series did not happen due to the COVID-19 pandemic.

Wisden Trophy (England v West Indies) 

This series was originally scheduled for June 2020 but was postponed due to the COVID-19 pandemic.

England v Pakistan

Bangladesh v New Zealand 

This series did not happen due to the COVID-19 pandemic.

2020–21

New Zealand v West Indies

Border–Gavaskar Trophy (Australia v India)

New Zealand v Pakistan

South Africa v Sri Lanka

Sri Lanka v England 

This series was originally scheduled for March 2020 but was postponed due to the COVID-19 pandemic.

Pakistan v South Africa

Bangladesh v West Indies 

This was originally a three-match series scheduled for January 2021.

Anthony de Mello Trophy (India v England) 

This was originally a five-match series.

South Africa v Australia 

This series did not take place as originally scheduled due to the COVID-19 pandemic and could not be a part of the Championship season.

Sobers–Tissera Trophy (West Indies v Sri Lanka)

Sri Lanka v Bangladesh 

This series originally comprised three Test matches and was scheduled for July–August 2020, then postponed to October 2020, but was rescheduled again due to the COVID-19 pandemic.

2021

Sir Vivian Richards Trophy (West Indies v South Africa) 

This series was scheduled to be played in July 2020 but was postponed due to the COVID-19 pandemic.

Final

Final standings

Statistics

Individual statistics 
The top 5 players in each category are listed.

Most runs

Most wickets

Highest individual score

Best bowling figures in an innings

Best bowling figures in a match

Best batting averages

Best bowling averages

Team statistics

Highest team totals

Lowest team totals

Highest successful run-chases

See also 
 Test cricket
 ICC Test Championship
 ICC Men's Test Team Rankings
 2020–23 ICC Cricket World Cup Super League
 2021–2023 ICC World Test Championship

Notes

References

External links 
 Official website
 Tournament home on ESPNcricinfo

ICC World Test Championship
Test cricket competitions
ICC World Test Championship
ICC World Test Championship
ICC World Test Championship